Paul Ziert is a former University of Oklahoma gymnastics coach. Ziert recruited Bart Conner to the school. In 1977 and 1978, Ziert's teams won the NCAA Men's Gymnastics championship.

Ziert cowrote a book with Conner, Winning the Gold, in 1985.  Ziert currently publishes International Gymnast Magazine.

References

Year of birth missing (living people)
Living people
American gymnastics coaches
Oklahoma Sooners men's gymnastics coaches